The Diverting Reservoir  is a reservoir in the New York City water supply system in the town of Southeast, New York, in Putnam County immediately south of the village of Brewster, New York. Construction impounding the East Branch Croton River began early in the 20th century and was completed by 1911.

The Diverting reservoir holds  of water at full capacity, making it the smallest in New York City's water supply outside the City itself. Its drainage basin represents  of the Croton River watershed. This basin includes the lakes, streams, rivers, and other bodies of water that flow into the reservoir. 

The Diverting Reservoir is also connected to the nearby Croton Falls Reservoir via a channel and dividing weir allowing water to freely pass between. The water in Diverting Reservoir flows into the continuation of the East Branch, which then joins the flow of the West Branch, itself carrying the flow of the Middle Branch, amid the headwaters of the Muscoot Reservoir, the collecting point for most of the Croton Watershed. It continues into the New Croton Reservoir, the final collecting point, then the New Croton Aqueduct. Water from the Aqueduct flows into the Jerome Park Reservoir.

In January 2007, the New York City Department of Environmental Protection began a $74 million project of improvements to the Croton Falls Reservoir and the Diverting Reservoir. (See Journal-News article dated Feb. 28, 2007) The upgrading and rehabilitation is part of the city's effort to comply with state and federal dam safety regulations. The work at the Diverting Reservoir includes new valves and pipes, along with redoing the spillway and some of the concrete surfaces on the -high dam. The connecting channel between the two reservoirs will be emptied, inspected and dredged. Construction at both sites is expected to continue until Jan. 31, 2010.

See also

List of reservoirs and dams in New York

References

External links
 NYCDEP Water Supply Watersheds-Links to information on reservoirs by system

Reservoirs in New York (state)
Croton Watershed
Protected areas of Putnam County, New York
Reservoirs in Putnam County, New York